This list describes characters from the anime and manga series Doraemon. Also listed are their original NTV voice actors (1973), followed by their TV Asahi voice actors (1979–2005; 2005–present). Part of the 22nd century characters are listed in The Doraemons.

Each main character represents a primary school student archetype. Nobita and Doraemon appears in every episode of the anime.

Note: In some translations of Doraemon, the names of these characters are different from the original names.

Main characters

Doraemon 
 

, known as Albert in the Cinar dub of the series, is the title character and co-protagonist of the series. He is a cat-like robot from the future. He was yellow-skinned and had ears originally. However, his ears were accidentally eaten by a robot mouse. It left him heartbroken and caused his skin to turn blue. People often mistake him for a raccoon dog. He is sent back in time by Sewashi (Nobita's Great-great-grandson) to aid Nobita. Doraemon possesses a 4-dimensional pocket from which he can acquire various kinds of futuristic tools, gadgets, and playthings from a future department store. He also has the tendency to panic during emergencies, characterized by him frantically trying to pull out a very much-needed tool from his pocket, only to produce a huge assortment of household items and unwanted gadgets. Still, Doraemon is very friendly and intelligent, not to mention long-suffering because of Nobita's antics. Since Sewashi sent Doraemon to the past, Doraemon has been living as the unofficial fourth member of Nobita's family and acts like a second son to Nobita's parents, since despite being a robot, he requires basic needs for a person, such as eating, and also sleeps in the closet of Nobita's bedroom. He also fears mice greatly (due to a robot mouse having eaten his ears), even go crazy about it and pull out devastating gadgets, and most of the times, Nobita saves Doraemon in such situations. Although he has no fingers in most media, he can hold things because of the suction cups in his hands. His favorite food is Dorayaki. He has also been shown to date with normal female cat. He is the elder brother of Dorami.

Nobita Nobi 

 is the co-protagonist of the series. He wears glasses, a red or yellow polo shirt with a white collar, and blue or black shorts and white socks and light blue shoes. Although he's not good at sports, he's good at shooting and has been reflected in the movies many time. He's also good at string figure which sometime considered a girls' game. Son of Tamako and Nobisuke Nobi. Future father of Nobisuke (his son). Future husband or boyfriend of Shizuka and great-great-grandfather of Sewashi.

Shizuka Minamoto 

 (born on 8 May, Taurus), nicknamed  is a smart, kind and pretty girl. She is often represented by the colour pink, and is seen wearing a pink shirt and skirt. The word 'Shizuka (しずか)' means 'Quiet'. She is Nobita's best friend and love-interest. She does not shun Nobita due to his failing grades, lazy disposition or constant failures. In fact, she often tries to encourage him to do better, though she usually fails to convince him. Shizuka likes to take a bath several times a day; however, a running gag in the series is that she is sometimes interrupted by a sudden appearance of Nobita (sometimes Doraemon, Gian, or Suneo) usually due to misuse of Doraemon's gadgets like the Anywhere Door (Doko Demo Doa in Japanese). Shizuka's skirt is also frequently seen getting flipped, either by Nobita misusing Doraemon's gadgets, or by the wind. Scenes in which her underwear is seen, or she is seen bathing, have been removed from the dubbed versions, especially in India, Europe, the United States and the United Kingdom. Her true passions are sweet potatoes, which she would rather keep to herself out of the knowledge of others, and the violin, in which her playing is just as horrendous as Gian's singing. She is also known for taking piano lessons unwillingly due to her mother's wishes (as she loves violin more), which is sometimes a reason for declining to hang out with friends (but she plays piano better than violin). Shizuka is an animal lover and keeps two pets at home: a dog, who is saved from succumbing to illness by Nobita and Doraemon in one story; and a canary which runs away on multiple occasions and causing Shizuka and Nobita to run around the city chasing her down.

She sometimes fancies some handsome idols on TV. Besides Nobita, Shizuka is also close to her classmate and popular student Dekisugi. Though they consider each other only as friends.

Takeshi "Gian" Goda 

 (born on 15 June, Gemini), named Buster in the Cinar dub and Bob in the Speedy dub, usually known by the nickname  is a strong and quick-tempered local bully. He also frequently steals other children's stuff (especially Nobita's and Suneo's) under the pretext of "borrowing" them, unless the toy is damaged. He is known for his awful singing voice, though he considers himself a great singer. To prove this, Gian sometimes "invites" others to attend his concerts, under the threat of beatings. His singing is so horrible that, once, Nobita and Doraemon try to mute it in a silent world, his writings of the song lyrics in a board end up having the same effect as when they hear them.Though his voice is terrible in one of the episodes it was shown that a girl liked his singing. In some films, his singing is enhanced to become an effective weapon (as in 'Nobita's Great Adventure in the South Seas'). In some episodes when his voice is recorded and he hears it, he instantly denies it being his voice and threatens to beat up the person who sang his songs in a very bad way (which is an irony). Gian is also confident in cooking, but just like his singing, his hand-made food can be a nightmare for other people very easily.

However, Gian does not hesitate to help his friends when they are in real trouble. Throughout the series, particularly the films, he is often the one who voices the most concern and refuses to look away when there is a problem, an opposite of Suneo's cowardice. While he is described by others as daunting and intimidating, he is very sensitive and prone to crying when something touching happens, and he actually values his friends highly, a feeling which his friends sometimes reciprocate. Gian also has a soft spot for his younger sister, Jaiko, and usually tries to prevent her from trouble, even if she can perfectly handle her situation. Gian basically is a bullying 'tsundere'.

Suneo Honekawa 

 (born on February 29, Pisces) is the fox-faced (inherited from his mother) rich child who loves to flaunt his material wealth before everyone, especially Nobita. A lot of the stories start with Suneo showing off some new video game, toy or pet which evokes Nobita's envy. He is often seen with Gian, teasing Nobita. He also often pushes Nobita aside with silly excuses while he invites Gian and Shizuka to his parties or resorts. However, he is actually one of Nobita's closest friends, who would often ask for his and Doraemon's help. In the films, Suneo is often the one most reluctant to take part in Nobita and Doraemon's adventures, and he also tries to face as little trouble as possible and go home, unless others convince him, making him somewhat a coward. He has an extensive knowledge of science, and is a talented artist and designer, besides being extremely cunning.

In some scenes, Suneo is seen as a narcissist who loves to stare at himself in the mirror while telling himself that he is the most handsome guy in the world. His habit of bragging often lands him into trouble. Suneo is also very self-conscious about his height, being the shortest kid in his class. He likes steak and melon. There are many reasons why Suneo chooses Shizuka and Gian, except Nobita. It is because he tries to win Shizuka's favour and not to get harmed by Gian.

Supporting characters

/ Tammy Nobi (née Kataoka) 
 
 Young 
 Tamako Nobi (born on 16 February, Aquarius) is Nobita's bespectacled, stay-at-home mother and one of the main protagonists in short stories, and the one Nobita inherits his appearance from. She can be extremely strict and she is often seen scolding Nobita for his actions, such as failing the exam, playing all day instead of studying, being lazy all day, or doing something stupid. Several episodes involve Nobita trying to avoid his mother's scolding by using Doraemon's gadgets. Despite her disappointment with Nobita's lazy attitude and academic failures (even when her house is occasionally visited by Nobita's teacher for his progress in school), she is actually a good mother and cares about her son deeply. Her maiden last name was revealed to be . Her anxiety about the high household expenses is a recurring feature. In a couple of episodes where Nobita sees her in the past, it is revealed that she was rebellious even as a girl. She dislikes animals and would always reject requests for any pet Nobita wants; making this plot point in some of the films and stories where Nobita has to take in stray animals secretly. However, in one story, her initial dislike of a cat turns her into adoring it so much that she becomes depressed when the cat's owner wants it back.

Adult: 
 Young: 
 Nobisuke (born on 12 March, Pisces), is Nobita's father and laid-back salaryman. He appears an easy-going father, often seen arriving home from work to soothe Tamako's anger towards Nobita. He has trouble quitting smoking and is self-conscious about his inability to pass the driving test. He also has a poor memory. He likes to drink, and sometimes arrives home drunk from nightly business meetings. Nobisuke often goes to golf which most Japanese businessmen and employees play. He had many similar personality traits with Nobita when he was young like getting bad grades, being poor at athletics, and getting scolded by his father. He has an impressive talent for painting, but did not choose to be an artist due to many reasons. Nobisuke is fond of Nobita and probably does not rebuke him like Tamako does because most of Nobita's inabilities and weaknesses remind him of his own childhood faults. Though he would makes comments or conversations that affect Nobita  considerably in one way or another. It was shown that he met Tamako on the day he had rejected an offer to be an artist from a wealthy gentleman, and feeling overjoyed, was running down the street at such speed that he barged straight into her, causing her to drop her ID card. This, he later returns and the acquaintance gradually turns into love and marriage.

/ Soby Nobi 
 
 Nobita's great-great-grandson, he is the one who sends Doraemon back to the past to look after Nobita. Sewashi first bought Doraemon in 2112 when Doraemon still had ears and his original factory paint. He sent him because his pocket money was not much due to the debts the family inherited from Nobita, and he also wanted to help out his troubled great-great-grandfather. He seems to have more common sense and is smarter than Nobita, but is just as reluctant when it comes to studying. Sewashi is also the owner of Doraemon's sister, Dorami.

She sports curly hair and shares the fox-like face with her son and husband. She loves Suneo very much and spoils him rotten. She is generous to Suneo's friends, but just like her son, she likes to show off her jewellery or branded handbags and sometimes makes Nobita's mother jealous. In the episode "Mother Vs. Rich Mother Battle," she became Tamako's rival after eating the Rival-Making steak and competes Tamako of who makes the tastiest curry. In the 30 years special, she is seen as just as odd, and mischievous as her son. She and her husband love to travel. She has a fear of dinosaurs.

/ Stan 
 
 Suneo's college age cousin. He is an expert in radio-controlled toys. He often takes Suneo and his friends (except Nobita) on picnics and hikes.
 In the closed captioning of Vacuum Cleaner Super Car, his Japanese name appears after the transformation of a driving school. It might be an error.

Young: 
 Adult: 
  is Nobita's classmate and friendly rival as he is a good friend of Shizuka's. He is very intelligent and has a photographic memory. Dekisugi is the perfect all-round student, consistently getting 100s in class (A+'s in English Dub) and also being highly capable in sports. His family is apparently wealthy, owning a house that is so large that one can lose one's way. His name literally means "brilliant over-achiever", and his last name is a pun on dekisugiru (出来過ぎる), which means "over achieving". Shizuka sometimes prefers the company of Dekisugi, who is more of her intellectual equal. Nobita often feels jealous and concocts bizarre schemes (helped by Doraemon's gadgets) to keep them apart or to win Shizuka's attention. However, Dekisugi never gets angry at Nobita and even willingly helps Nobita whenever he has philosophical or scientific questions. Dekisugi is polite, respectful, and will never argue with or fault anyone even in the most ridiculous of situations – instead he will always say something positive to lighten the mood.

In the future, it is shown that in spite of Shizuka's friendship with Dekisugi, she still marries Nobita while Dekisugi himself is wed to another woman. The Dekisugi family becomes a very close associate of the Nobi family with the families' children being friends with each other.

Dorami 

 (born on 2 December 2114, Sagittarius) is Doraemon's younger sister. Like Doraemon before he developed a fear of mice, she is yellow-skinned, and to keep Doraemon from thinking about his ears, her ears were replaced by a large red bow, her the fox tail were replaced by a flower tail. She and Doraemon are siblings due to the fact that they shared half of the oil from a can when she was made. Dorami lives in the 22nd-century Tokyo with Sewashi. She sometimes visits Nobita with a time machine when Doraemon is "off-duty", to help Doraemon with something or to take care of Nobita when Doraemon has gone for his yearly health checkup. Dorami likes melonpan and is afraid of cockroaches like Nobita's mom. She is also shown to be a more advanced robot than Doraemon (Dorami is able to produce 10,000 horse power, in comparison to Doraemon's 129.3). Different from her malfunctioning brother, she is the smartest student during her school time, and has better skills in using gadgets. In a story, Nobita is intent on replacing Doraemon with Dorami due to her better skills; however, he quickly learns the fact that Dorami does not understand him as much as Doraemon does and will not tolerate his usual antics. Dorami also has her own spin-off manga. In the manga series The Doraemons, she is the love interest of Dora-the-Kid, Doraemon's friendly rival and the one most similar to him.

Shizuka's mother. She is very kind, but can also be quite exigent on Shizuka sometimes. She wants Shizuka to take up piano lessons when the latter would rather want to practice violin.

She is the owner of a small but successful store "Goda Greengrocers" ("Goda's Goods" in the English anime) as well as the only character Gian is deathly afraid of. In the 1973 anime, Mrs. Goda was dead. In later anime projects, she is alive. Gian always tries to flee from her when she orders him to help in the matters of the store or do deliveries. Though being as strong as her son, she is a righteous person as she punishes her son whenever he bullies children as she doesn't want to let Gian hurt other children. Her harsh treatment towards Gian is driven by her love, and Gian too, though sometimes speaking ill of her, cares for his mother deeply. This is evident from the way Gian had painstakingly made a rice-cake, actually a gadget from Doraemon, which had healed his mother's health problem, despite being constantly mocked and annoyed during the process by Nobita and Suneo. Had he lost focus, the gadget would have lost effectiveness, but his love for his mother prevented him from losing concentration.

is Gian's younger sister, and also the only child Gian treats well in the whole story, and Jaiko too loves her elder brother. In earlier stories, she had bad tempers when something did not go as she pleases, though she mellows down in later stories. Had Doraemon not intervened, she would have been Nobita's wife in the future which is why her first appearance is earlier than Suneo and Gian in the series. However, Doraemon succeeds on his mission and Nobita eventually marries Shizuka. Her name Jaiko is usually considered a nickname in the same vein as her brother; her given name is never revealed in the series.

As an aspiring manga artist, Jaiko goes by her pen name , and sometimes submits her manga to publishing companies for prizes. She usually fails because her storytelling is still rough, although she has received much attention from editors. Sometimes when she almost decides to give up writing comic books after failing to get good ideas, Gian and his friends, after being requested and sometimes forced, cheer her up. Unlike Gian, she is kind, polite and good at studies. She and Moteo Mote are good friends. He appreciates her cartoons and encourages her to write more.

/ Pork Chop 
 
 Gian and Jaiko's cowardly pet dog, who was a little stray dog when he was adopted by the Godas. Muku tries to be as brave as Gian, who praises his strength and courage, but in many emergencies he just runs away and enrages Gian. Initially Gian tried to get rid of him, but after he saved Gian, he has warmed up to him and become really friendly. Jaiko loves Muku very much and takes him on walks regularly. Muku occasionally shows the bad habit of gathering things from the locality in his kennel, much to Gian's embarrassment and his mother's displeasure.

/ Mr. S 
 
  is a strict unnamed teacher at Nobita's school who often scolds Nobita for not completing his homework, arriving late at school, forgetting his homework, falling asleep during class, and getting worse marks on his tests. He sometimes tries to encourage Nobita through kindness to study and not get 0 marks, and sometimes resorts to punishments that range from making Nobita stay in the hallway or clean the classroom windows alone after school. While Teacher is impressed by Dekisugi's progress and occasionally scolds Gian, Suneo tends to fool Teacher with conning lies or superstitions. Teacher often pays unexpected visits to the Nobi's in order to inform Tamako Nobi about Nobita's recent exam results and his academic position. Nobita's feelings towards him are varied ranging from fear to respect and admiration depending on the situation.

His real name is unknown. In the TV Asahi version, he was once named , whose family name happens to mean "teacher" but is read differently. In the English dub, he is called Mr S.

/ Mr. Rumbleton 
 
 Kaminari is an old man living next to the Open Plot where Nobita and his friends play. It is seen often that the baseballs and footballs are breaking the glass of Kaminari's window (a woman's window in early manga chapters) or destroying one of his favorite bonsai plants or his plants. which angers Kaminari a lot. The children always try not to anger Kaminari and play carefully. Recovering the ball without getting shouted at is too difficult. Gian and Suneo quite often break his glass and make Nobita the scapegoat to recover the ball. He also has a wife who rarely appears and a beautiful granddaughter, Mizue, that Nobita and other boys has a crush in her.

A pregnant regular female cat with crotch belly in the 1973 anime.

/ Mimi 
 
 A regular female cat from Nobita's timeline, who either hangs out or goes on dates with Doraemon. She to Doraemon is similar with Shizuka to Nobita, however, besides Noramyako, Doraemon love interests her but still often has new crush on other cats in the whole series.
 In the close captioning of Invasion of the Body Swappers, Mimi is spelled Meenie; it is not known if this is an error.

Other characters

/ Chester Nobi 
 
 Nobisuke's younger brother and an uncle of Nobita, with whom he is very friendly. He works overseas and only comes home during the Christmas-New Year holiday, which Nobita happily awaits every year since his uncle always gives him (and Doraemon) pocket money and presents on that time. He has a noticeably tanned skin due to his frequent stays in the tropics. In one chapter, he recounts on his many animal encounters, including an elephant which he thought had perished during World War II. The elephant is actually saved by Nobita and Doraemon due to a case of predestination paradox.

She is Nobirou's daughter and Nobita's younger cousin. She is fond of Nobita and would play with him whenever she visits his house.

Tamako's younger brother and Nobita's uncle. He is a cowardly car salesman, and this cowardliness prevented him from expressing his feelings to the woman he loves. Nobita and Doraemon, despite initially deteriorating matters, finally help him to propose to (and be accepted by) the lady.

Voiced by: Unknown
 He is Nobirou and Nobisuke's father and Nobita's paternal grandfather who died before Nobita's birth. He was very strict and very rude to Nobisuke since he valued physical strength and athleticism which Nobisuke lacked, though after all he loved him very much. He did not apparently favour Nobisuke's artistic prowess, but he really treasured the portrait his son had made of him, and for which Nobisuke got first prize in school. His grandson only saw him when he traveled to the past. Despite being harsh to Nobisuke, he enjoys indulging Nobita when Nobita travels to the past.

She died when Nobita was in kindergarten before the main storyline. She is always seen as a kind woman, if a bit eccentric, and unlike her husband never scolded Nobisuke for his lack of interest in "masculine activities", such as getting in a fight. Nobita remembers her very fondly, with most of his better childhood memories being playing with her; many of his toys, including his old kendama, which becomes a plot point in one film, were given to him by his grandmother. When Nobita travels to the past, she always recognizes him as her grandson even if he has grown up. She appeared in a few episodes. She takes care of Nobita on his former days and in one of The Doraemons manga, she was proud to see Nobita grown up into a teenage boy.

Nobita and Shizuka's son, named after Nobita's father. Though being as stupid as his father, he is a strong child and a good athlete, and brave enough to bully Gian and Suneo's sons (possibly as retaliation for all of his father's suffering from their dads). The first time he met the present Nobita, he even beat up Nobita because he regarded him as an imposter. His wife's name is Yukari. His son, grandson, granddaughter-in-law are not named. He is the great-grandfather of Sewashi. His daughter-in-law is not shown in anime or manga or other media.

Shizuka's father, a normal salaryman who often goes to movies with Shizuka. His best-known appearance in the series is when Nobita and Doraemon eavesdrop on him talking to Shizuka the night before Nobita and her wedding, in which he trusts that Nobita will be able to take care of Shizuka. So he accepts Nobita as his daughter's spouse. He is the only parent of Nobita's friends who is named. It is a fact that Shizuka has 3 fathers in different episodes.

/ Sunny 
 
 Shizuka's lovely pet canary. It is yellow in color and sings sweetly. Peeko (Pii-chan) escapes from the cage very often as a way of freedom. Rescuing Peeko is the plot of many episodes.

Pero 
 
 Shizuka's pet dog. He was saved by Nobita and Doraemon from succumbing from a fever

Kazu 
Shizuka's cousin. He appeared in few episodes.

A successful businessman. He has many relationships with business elites as a part of Suneo's showing off. He appears less frequently than his wife, mostly when going tours with family or inviting Suneo's friends to his party. In the 30 years special, he is said to be mischievous as well.

Suneo's younger brother who lives in New York City with his uncle (who is single and raised him like a son). He has a good personality and a great respect for his older brother, but only because of Suneo's arrogant brags and lies in their correspondence. He often whispers to Suneo about Hana. Regarding her as a sweet lovely girl.

Suneo's great grandmother uses old wives' tales to impart values and good habits to Suneo, much to his displeasure.

/ Lizzie 
 
 Suneo's pet cat. She is a persian cat often praised very much by Suneo's mother. Her face is also like the rest of Honekawa family.

Suneo's Uncle 
He lives with Sunetsugu in New York city. He raised Sunetsugu alone like his own son. He is single. He sometimes appears in Doraemon episodes. He is Mr. Honekawa's younger brother.

He mostly works outside to help his wife's store. Though being the parent who is the least recurring in Fujiko's story, he is known to be the strongest man in the town that he lives in. He is somewhat like Gian and would often flaunt his strength with others including Nobisuke Nobi who is just as weak as his son. He has mixed feelings for Gian where he would like and care him and occasionally would scold him for doing bad deeds.

Gian's maternal uncle. He is a black belt in judo and uses this ability to help other people. He taught Gian to use his strength in helping the weak. He also began teaching his nephew judo and he appeared in an episode

/ Sera Ivy 
 
 Tsubasa Ito is a popstar and TV actress who is very popular. Suneo often gets her autograph and shows it off to his friends. Doraemon is apparently a huge fan of her since it is shown in one episode that he has pictures of her all over his closet.

An annoying female robot duck. She was removed from later versions of the manga and never appeared in the 1979 or 2005 anime series due to the fact that Fujiko Fujio heavily disliked her annoying personality, she hasn't made any other appearances since then.

A snobby and mean girl that rarely appears.

Along with Debuko, one of Shizuka's friends in the 1973 anime.

Along with Jamako, one of Shizuka's friends in the 1973 anime.

Matsushiba Factory's Manager 

He blamed himself for Doraemon being an outmode but after seeing Doraemon and Nobita's friendship and brotherhood, he aborted his reset in one episode.

Yosou  
A character often seen with Gian and Suneo playing in vacant lot or in the baseball field.

Notes

References 

Characters

Fujiko F Fujio